The Year 4338: Petersburg Letters is an 1835 novel by Vladimir Odoevsky. It is a futuristic novel, set in the year 4338, a year before Biela's Comet was to collide with the Earth as computed in the 1820s although the comet burned up later in the nineteenth century. This work was originally conceived as the third part of a trilogy, which was also to have featured depictions of Russia in the time of Peter the Great and in the author's contemporary period, the 1830s. The first part was never written and the second and futuristic parts remained unfinished. Fragments were published in 1835 and 1840, with the fullest version appearing in 1926. 

The world described in Odoevsky's work is in some respects similar to the 21st century and yet differs significantly from the present we currently encounter. Some of the technological advances included in the Petersburg Letters are air and space travel, the telephone, artificially controlled climates and the ability to photocopy. Hallucinogenic and truth drugs, in the forms of gaseous drinks and "magnetic baths" remove hypocrisy from social life. In this envisioned future, Russia and China are the centers of global power. Russia and China united their efforts to avoid Earth's collision with another planet. In the novel, China is described as having experienced a "deadly stagnation" which came to an end with the rule of Hin Gin in the 39th century. The main character of the story is actually a Chinese student, Ippolit Tsunguev, (not a Russian character, as might be expected) who attends St. Petersburg's "Main School". His letters to his fellow students constitute the novel.

References

External links
 Original text including extra fragments
 English translation

1835 Russian novels
Russian science fiction novels
Novels by Vladimir Odoevsky
Utopian novels
1830s science fiction novels
Fiction set in the 5th millennium
Unfinished novels